is a side-scrolling platform game developed by Nihon Falcom. It was originally released for the NEC PC-8801 home computer in 1991 and the PC-9801 in 1992. The game was later ported to the PC Engine CD-ROM by NEC Home Electronics, to the Sega CD by Sega, to DoJa mobile phones by Bothtec, and to the Super Famicom and Microsoft Windows by Falcom.

After the failed attempt to bring the game to the west by reworking it to be the part of Sonic the Hedgehog series, the Sega CD version of the game was localized by Working Designs and released in North America in late 1994. Most versions of Popful Mail are for the most part similar to each other, but the Super Famicom and Sega CD versions differ significantly both from each other and from the previous releases.

Gameplay 

Popful Mail is a 2D platform game with several RPG elements - excluding the ability to level-up characters. The controls allow the player to jump, attack, open doors or treasure chests, and speak to another character. Additionally, the player can summon a menu to change some of the game's attributes, the current character, the current character's equipment, use or activate an item, read the game's status, save, load and quit.

At the start of the game, the only playable character is Mail; as the game progresses, Tatt and Gaw will be available, and the player may switch between them at any time through the use of the "character" option in the menu (except in the middle of dialogues). Each character has different attacks and armor, as well as differences in walking speed and jump. Mail is the fastest character, but is the one whose jump is lowest. Tatt is balanced - slower than Mail but faster than Gaw - and his jump is similarly in between. Gaw is the slowest of the three, but can jump the highest and usually has the strongest attacks.

The character encounters enemies as well as non-playable characters. Often, when encountering an important character, dialogue begins immediately, with the player having no control over it. These important dialogues are by default always voice acted; text accompanies them, and the voiced speech can be turned off in an options menu if so desired.

The character has 100 health points, and attacks from enemy characters diminish it according to the strength of the attacker. Similarly, all enemies have a 100 health point bar that has to be brought down to 0 for the enemy to be defeated. How much damage is dealt depends on the strength of the character, although an attack always causes the same amount of damage to the same enemy. The character also has a blue-grey bar that is depleted as a distance weapon or a magical attack is used. When the bar reaches 0, the character can still perform the weapon motion, but the magical or long range portion of the attack will fail. The bar regenerates quickly if given time to do so (if the character uses no attacks or switches to a melee weapon). Use of a distance weapon or magical attack while the bar is regenerating halts the regeneration, which resumes if no attacks that deplete it are made.

Each character can acquire up to five different weapons and various items. Each subsequent weapon is stronger than the preceding one, although the player may switch to any weapons possessed at any time if so desired, through the menu. Weapons include a sword, dagger, boomerang, staff, fireball, and claw. Items, different from weapons and armor, either affect the health bar or the character's status or serve as plot devices. They may confer invulnerability at a price, stability in snow, or replenish health, among other things. They can be obtained from other characters, treasure chests, shops, or bosses.

The game has a practical save game feature. Games may usually be saved and loaded at any point in the game (except during dialogues, world map travels, and the animated sequences); if a game that was previously saved in a room with a boss is loaded, the game resumes just before the battle, before the character has entered the room. The state of the game, including the hours played and the level, will be displayed. Three save slots are supplied, for storing up to three different states.

Plot 
Portrayed differently from port to port, set in an unnamed fantasy world, a prologue tells of a grand legend related to the realm. Long ago, three fallen gods of darkness known as the Masters of Evil attempted to lay siege to the mortal plane. They were Morgal, the Lord of Beasts, commander of the feral and the most voracious of monsters and beasts; Necros, the Master of War, corruptor of men and the inciter of temptation and vice; and Ulgar, the Overlord, the leader of the Masters of Evil and wielder of the most evil of magics. At the end of a great war that threatened all who lived, the Masters of Evil were sealed away in a floating tower far from the reach of anyone, with only three warriors - an elf, a human, and a dwarf - surviving to tell the tale.

In the present day, the main character and local bounty hunter Popful Mail makes her rounds. Her day escalates to the point where she squares off with her bounty, the criminal golem maker and technomancer, Nuts Cracker, into a nearby forest. Though defeated, Nuts Cracker's body manages to escape, and Mail cannot claim any bounty. Frustrated, she indifferently takes Nuts Cracker's head and wanders back into town. At the bounty post she attempts to trade the head in for cash, but like with many who have sought to capture Nuts Cracker before her, duplicates of his head are all they could retrieve, making the attempt a failure. She becomes reinvigorated when she spots a 2,000,000 gold reward poster for the wizard turned criminal, Muttonhead, near the post. With sword in hand and hope in heart, Mail makes leads into the nearby forest for clues. Her quest to undertake the biggest catch of her career will turn out greater, more perilous, more dangerous - and more rewarding - than she imagined.

Characters 
 The main playable character is Popful Mail (usually called "Mail" by other characters), a female elf bounty hunter who has not had much luck lately. Mail's main target Nuts Cracker always seems to escape after she defeats him. Mail has red hair and elven ears stick outward from her head. Her personality is rather confrontational, and she is never drawn as humorous or morose. Her main and starting weapon is a sword, though she can acquire a dagger and boomerang as the game progresses.
 Tatt is a magician, a former apprentice of Muttonhead. Tatt chases after his master, who has left him and his fellow students, in order to dissuade him from his path. Tatt is kind, polite, a bit timid and is sometimes ridiculed. His main weapon is a magical staff. He has blue hair and wears a red hat, perhaps to present him as neither a black magician nor a white one or possibly a red mage (a combination of the two).
 Gaw is a small, round, winged, cave-dwelling purple creature. He is almost identical to all the others of his species, who both call themselves "Gaw" and often use the word as an interjection when speaking. Mail and Tatt meet Gaw in the second level, the Caves, but Gaw joins them later still. Gaw's first main attack is a fireball; subsequent attacks include a tail swipe and clawing.
 Nuts Cracker, the first villain seen in the game, is the leader of a dangerous criminal gang known as the Gingerbread Grifter Gang. He specializes in manufacturing explosives, especially exploding dolls. Only appearing to be human, Nuts Cracker is fashioned like a nutcracker, wood and all, implying he had himself transformed into a machination. He speaks in a goofy, exaggerated Italian accent. When defeated, he will often throw his head - which explodes - while his body runs away. Mail has been trying to catch Nuts Cracker for a long time and has faced him on many occasions, but he always escapes.
 Muttonhead was formerly a well-known and respected magician before unexpectedly disappearing from public view and turning to crime, a move that left his apprentices puzzled. He is dangerous and his goals are unknown. A 2,000,000 gold bounty is offered for his capture.
 Slick is an elf acquaintance of Mail's. He often wants to tag along with Mail on her adventures, which, along with his bad jokes and obnoxious demeanor, annoys her to no end. He often causes more trouble than he solves and is especially infamous for his use of homemade bombs, which his grandfather taught him how to make.
 Glug is a kindly dwarf from the mines. Unlike everyone else, he enjoys Slick's company and they are both friends. It is hinted that Glug suffers from mental problems as a result of a strong knock on the head, which might also explain his naiveté and short memory.

Development 
Falcom developed the NEC PC versions of Popful Mail with features used in previous games in the company's Dragon Slayer and Ys series. They use the battle system of Ys, magic attacks like those of Ys II, and a side-scrolling view similar to that of Ys III. Characters react with pain when they fall from high places, as in Dragon Slayer IV (released as Legacy of the Wizard in North America). The original releases incorporate features from the popular game Xanadu (Dragon Slayer II) as well. The gameplay of Popful Mail was compared to the Metroid series by some critics, and is retroactively considered part of metroidvania genre.

The game was released for the NEC PC-8801 computer on December 20, 1991, and for the PC-9801 in 1992. It was later ported to the Sega CD by SIMS Co., Ltd. and "Sega Falcom", a partnership of the original developer Nihon Falcom and Sega, in April 1994, and to the PC Engine CD by NEC Home Electronics and its subsidiary HuneX in August 1994. Popful Mail also received a remake by Falcom themselves for Super Famicom in June 1994. A mobile phone version similar to the original NEC PC-8801 release for DoJa-supported systems was published in five parts from 2003 to 2004 by Bothtec. The latest release of the game is the unchanged port to the Microsoft Windows, released on December 28, 2006, in Japan.

A soundtrack titled  containing music from the game in the CD format was published by Falcom Sound Team on August 24, 1994, in Japan.

Localization 
Plans to localize Popful Mail for an English release were first made by Sega, which wanted to replace the characters with characters from the Sonic franchise. This project, called Sister Sonic, was to star Sonic the Hedgehog's long lost sister. Sister Sonic was announced as a role-playing game in the Sonic the Hedgehog series with no mention of it being a rework of Popful Mail. Sega planned to reveal it at the American International Toy Fair in June 1993, but the game was never revealed. Upon hearing reports that the game was a rework of Popful Mail, fans launched a campaign, sending letters to Sega urging them to release Popful Mail in its original, Japanese state. Due to the negative feedback, Sister Sonic was delayed and eventually cancelled. Electronic Gaming Monthly cited the incident as an example of the power of consumers to influence video game companies.

The localization of Popful Mail was later handed to Working Designs, which made several changes and adjustments for its North American Sega CD release. Enemies were made more difficult, downsampling and variable bitrates were used to compress the game's sounds from full 44.1 kHz CD quality to fit on the game disc. In animated sequences, waveform analysis was used to make characters' mouths match their dialogue. Two teams worked on the English translation for four months.

Reception 

Famitsu gave the SFC version 24/40, the PCE version 23/40, and the Sega CD version 22/40.

The Sega CD version received a score of 31 out of 40 (average 7.75 out of 10) from Electronic Gaming Monthly. They especially praised the game's "cinema scenes". GamePro likewise gave their greatest praise to the cinema scenes and extensive voice acting, saying they "add great color to the game, setting these quirky characters apart from the standard mold of RPG heroes and villains." They also commented positively on the game's linear, undemanding gameplay. Retro Gamer included it on their list of top ten Mega CD games.

Next Generation reviewed the Sega CD version of the game, rating it three stars out of five, and stated that "If your sense of humor is off-kilter enough, it shouldn't matter how old you are."

Legacy 
Falcom used Popful Mail and its characters in various other media.

Popful Mail was adapted into a manga that was a part Mediaworks and Dengeki Comic Gao! in July 1996, and was written by Yuu Aizaki.

Falcom created , another drama CD published by King that features Mail, on 22 November 1995. GameMusic.com sells Tarako and Paradise dramas 2 through 5 in the United States.

As with Ys IV, an attempt was made to pitch an anime OVA based on the game to various anime studios, but the pilot failed to garner interest. The promotional video is all that came of the idea, which imagines Mail and friends finding themselves in Tokyo upon fighting a new foe.

Mail and Gaw, along with other Falcom characters, would return as secret "Masters" in the 1997 Falcom game Vantage Master. Mail's outfit was featured as a downloadable costume for Tina Armstrong in Tecmo Koei's Dead or Alive 5: Last Round.

Notes

References

External links 
 Falcom's Major Titles: Other Titles — an official Falcom website in English, with a section on Popful Mail and its characters
 ファルコムの主なタイトル: そのほかのタイトル  — Japanese version of the previous page
 

1991 video games
Platform games
NEC PC-8801 games
NEC PC-9801 games
Fantasy video games
Nihon Falcom games
Sega CD games
Side-scrolling role-playing video games
SIMS Co., Ltd. games
Sega video games
Super Nintendo Entertainment System games
TurboGrafx-CD games
Video games featuring female protagonists
Working Designs
Windows games
Metroidvania games
Fictional elves
Single-player video games
Video games developed in Japan
HuneX games